Lieutenant General Sir John Charles Chisholm Richards,  (21 February 1927 – 5 October 2004) was a Royal Marines officer who served as Marshal of the Diplomatic Corps in the Royal Household from 1982 to 1991.

Military career
Educated at Worksop College, Richards joined the Royal Marines in 1945. He was appointed commanding officer of 45 Commando in 1968, commander of 42 Commando in 1972, and commander of 3 Commando Brigade in 1975 before becoming Commandant General Royal Marines in 1977 and retiring in 1981.

In retirement Richards became Her Majesty's Marshal of the Diplomatic Corps in the Royal Household from 1982 to 1991.

Family
In 1953 Richards married Audrey Hidson; they had two sons and one daughter.

References

1927 births
2004 deaths
British military personnel of the Aden Emergency
British military personnel of the Malayan Emergency
Knights Commander of the Order of the Bath
Knights Commander of the Royal Victorian Order
Marshals of the Diplomatic Corps
People educated at Worksop College
Royal Marines generals